Jiu, JIU or JiU may refer to :

 Jiu (river), a tributary of the Danube in Romania
 Alcoholic beverages, known as jiǔ in Chinese
 Ținutul Jiu, a former administrative division of Romania
 Joint Inspection Unit, a United Nations entity
 IATA code of Jiujiang Lushan Airport, China
 Jino language, ISO 639-3 language code
 Jones International University, a predominantly on-line school located in Centennial, Colorado
 Josai International University, private university in Japan
 JiU, member of Korean girl group Dreamcatcher
 , a Japanese new religion led by Jikōson

See also 
 Jiul de Est, a headwater of the river Jiu in Romania
 Jiul de Vest, a headwater of the river Jiu in Romania
 Târgu Jiu, city in Romania
 Roșia-Jiu, a village in Fărcășești Commune, Gorj County, Romania